Antenna temperature may refer to:
 Antenna noise temperature
 Antenna gain-to-noise-temperature